Strobisia sapphiritis is a moth of the family Gelechiidae. It was described by Edward Meyrick in 1914. It is found in Guyana.

The wingspan is 12–13 mm. The forewings are bronzy blackish with metallic-blue markings. There is a dot near the base in the middle, a curved oblique series of three towards the base, and one beneath the fold at one-fourth. There is an oblique strigula from the costa at one-third, and a dot beneath it. There is also an oblique streak from the middle of the costa reaching halfway across the wing and a triangle irregularly outlined on the dorsum beyond the middle, reaching nearly halfway across the wing. A curved irregular submarginal streak runs from four-fifths of the costa to the tornus, thickest opposite the apex. The hindwings are dark fuscous.

References

Moths described in 1914
Strobisia